George Carpenter (28 February 1818 – 3 June 1849) was an English first-class cricketer active 1838–1844 who played for Cambridge Town Club. He was born and died in Cambridge. A brother of Robert Carpenter, he appeared in nine first-class matches.

Notes

1818 births
1849 deaths
English cricketers
Cambridge Town Club cricketers